General José María de la Cruz Prieto (Concepción, March 25, 1799 – November 23, 1875) was a Chilean soldier.

The son of Luis de la Cruz and of Josefa Prieto Sotomayor, and was a cousin of future presidents José Joaquín Prieto and Manuel Bulnes. He joined the Army on October 27, 1811, and participated actively in the battles of Chacabuco, Maipu and Pangal during the Chilean War of Independence. He married Josefa Zañartu Trujillo, and had a single daughter: Delfina de la Cruz Zañartu who in turn was the wife of future president Aníbal Pinto.

During the War of the Confederation, he was the under-commandant-in-chief of the Restoration Army, under General Manuel Bulnes, having special participation in the victory of Yungay.

After the war, he was Intendant of Valparaíso and later, of Concepción. He ran for president in 1851, but was defeated by Manuel Montt. His defeat caused him to revolt in the southern provinces, starting the 1851 revolution. His cousin Manuel Bulnes crushes the revolutionary attempt and signs the treaty of Purapel with the revolutionaries.

After that he retired from politics, dying in Concepcion at the age of 76.

1799 births
1875 deaths
Cruz Family
Candidates for President of Chile
Chilean Ministers of Defense
Chilean Army generals
Chilean military personnel of the War of the Confederation
People from Concepción, Chile
People of the Chilean War of Independence
People of the 1851 Chilean Revolution